Miriam-Olivia Steinel (born 14 November 1982 in Bad Aibling) is a German former ice dancer. She teamed up with Vladimir Tsvetkov in November 1997 and competed with him until 2003. They are two-time Junior Grand Prix Final bronze medalists.

Programs 
(with Tsvetkov)

Results 
(with Tsvetkov)

References

External links
 

1982 births
Living people
German female ice dancers
People from Bad Aibling
Sportspeople from Upper Bavaria